Dechko Uzunov (February 22, 1899 – April 26, 1986) was a Bulgarian painter. He was born in Kazanluk and died in Sofia at the age of 87. His work was part of the painting event in the art competition at the 1936 Summer Olympics.

References

1899 births
1986 deaths
Bulgarian artists
Bulgarian watercolor painters
Bulgarian realist painters
Bulgarian romantic painters
Members of the Bulgarian Academy of Sciences
People from Kazanlak
20th-century Bulgarian painters
20th-century male artists
Olympic competitors in art competitions
Male painters